Cam is a 2018 American psychological horror film directed by Daniel Goldhaber and written by Isa Mazzei from a story by Goldhaber, Mazzei and Isabelle Link-Levy. The story is partially drawn from writer Mazzei's own experience working as a camgirl. The film is the first feature film for both Goldhaber and Mazzei.

It stars Madeline Brewer, Patch Darragh, Melora Walters, Devin Druid and Michael Dempsey. It is a co-production between Divide/Conquer, Blumhouse Productions and Gunpowder & Sky.

The film premiered at the Fantasia International Film Festival on July 18, 2018, and was released on November 16, 2018, by Netflix. It received a largely positive reception from critics, who praised the atmosphere, direction, and Brewer's performance.

Plot
Alice Ackerman works as a camgirl on a website called FreeGirlsLive, broadcasting sexually promiscuous live shows from a studio she has set up in her home under the name "Lola_Lola”. She is obsessed with her rank on the site, hoping to be number 1, a spot currently held by a camgirl named BabyGirl. Her mother is unaware of her career, believing that she works in web development. Her younger brother, Jordan, knows about Alice's job and has agreed to keep it a secret, though he persuades Alice to tell their mother the truth someday. During one livestream, Alice simulates her suicide by slitting her own throat using fake blood, which greatly increases her popularity. Alice has two loyal viewers, Barney and Arnold (also known as "Tinker"), whom she regularly engages in private video calls with. She soon learns that Barney will be in her area next week, and agrees to meet up for a date. Alice also recognizes Arnold in a store, and realizes that he has moved to her state.

During her next show, Alice finally reaches the top 50, but her rank quickly drops due to a rival camgirl known as Princess_X. She is able to bring her rank up to 47 with a successful joint show featuring another camgirl, Fox. The following morning, Alice finds that she cannot access her FGL account, but that Lola is still active and currently streaming. Curious, she logs into a spare account to watch the stream to find that the channel has been taken over by someone with her exact appearance and mannerisms – even the studio is an exact replica of Alice's studio in her home.

Alice contacts the site's customer service, believing that they are replaying old shows, but they assure her that this is impossible. When Alice messages the channel, the "Lola" on-screen responds to her and addresses her directly, proving that the stream is in fact live. Alice confides in her fellow camgirls about the situation, and accuses Princess_X of being the one responsible for it, but Princess swears her innocence.

Alice continues to try and access her FGL account, as well as create a new one, but all her attempts fail. At Jordan's birthday party, a fight breaks out between him and his friends after they happen across one of Alice's streams and ridicule her, which causes her mother to inadvertently find out the truth. A humiliated Alice panics and leaves. That night, the fake Lola hosts a show in which she stages her own suicide by shooting herself in the mouth. It causes Alice to have a panic attack, and she contacts the police, who are largely unhelpful and judgmental. When the fake Lola announces an upcoming joint show with BabyGirl, Alice unsuccessfully attempts to get in contact with Baby, though she grows suspicious when Baby uses the same phrases in her stream that the fake Lola did.

During her date with Barney, Alice cleverly manages to get him to reveal Baby's hometown. She excuses herself to the bathroom to further investigate on her phone, but "Lola" goes live right at that moment. Barney confronts and assaults her, accusing her of lying about her identity to try and scam him, but Alice manages to free herself. Alice uses the information provided by Barney to find Baby's real name, which is Hannah Darin, and discovers that the real Hannah had passed away in a car crash six months prior – meaning that she has been replaced by a doppelgänger as well. She searches for other camgirls that she assumes to be doppelgängers and notices that each of the fake girls have Arnold as their top friend. She seeks him out at a motel he mentioned he was staying at earlier, tearfully begging for his help. He offers to let her stay the night at his motel out of concern for her safety. Alice wakes up in the middle of the night to find Arnold in the bathroom, masturbating while in a private cam session with Lola. An enraged Alice demands answers from Arnold, who reveals that he knows about the replicas, but insists that he is not behind them. Alice then talks to the fake Lola from Arnold's computer, who appears to be oblivious to the fact that they are identical. She angrily leaves, ignoring Arnold's pleas with her to stay.

Alice goes home and sets up her vanity mirror, camera, and television in a position that creates an illusion showing multiples of her. She joins a private cam session with the fake Lola (who once again doesn't recognize her) and suggests that they go live together. The fake Lola enthusiastically agrees and viewers chalk up the two Lolas to special effects. Alice challenges Lola to a game – they must imitate each other; whoever the viewers think does the best wins. If Alice wins, she gets to ask anything of Lola. Alice is declared the winner after breaking her own nose, and she demands Lola's account password. She then deletes Lola's account just as it reaches the number 1 rank.

Some time later, she prepares to start a live show under a new account, with her mother assisting. The film ends as she starts all over again with a new identity.

Cast

Production
Screenwriter Isa Mazzei, a former cam girl herself, wanted to create a documentary film about cam girls. She decided that a documentary was not the best medium, telling Vice, "I felt like often, for people that I talk to about camming, no matter how much I would explain it or show it to them, they still didn't fully get it." She decided a horror film would be a better way to present the story.

Much of the story was drawn from Mazzei's own experience as a cam girl. The story element of Lola having her image stolen came from Mazzei having her camming videos pirated and reposted without crediting her. Alice's interactions with the police officers are taken from Mazzei and other sex workers' experiences of being dismissed and hit on when reaching out for help. According to Mazzei, the question one of the police officers asks her, "What's the weirdest thing you've ever had to do?", was actually asked of her by several Hollywood executives in meetings once they learned that she had previously worked as a cam model.

Mazzei and director Daniel Goldhaber had been friends since high school, and he had previously directed some of her pornographic videos. Goldhaber's directing credits had previously only been shorts and student films.

The film was shot over 20 days. Principal photography on the film began on March 27, 2017. The film wrapped on April 23, 2017.

The film has a joint opening credit "A Film by Isa Mazzei & Daniel Goldhaber", in place of the traditional opening credit which only credits the director. According to Mazzei and Goldhaber this was done as "a rebuke to director-oriented auteurship".

Release
The film had its world premiere at the Fantasia International Film Festival on July 18, 2018. Shortly after, Netflix acquired distribution rights to the film. It was released on November 16, 2018.

Reception

Critical response 

The website's critical consensus reads, "Smart and suspenseful, CAM is a techno-thriller that's far more than the sum of its salacious parts – and an outstanding showcase for Madeline Brewer in the leading role." Metacritic reports a weighted average score 71 out of 100, based on 17 critics, indicating "generally favorable reviews".

Accolades

References

External links
  on Netflix
 
 

2018 films
2018 directorial debut films
2018 horror films
2018 horror thriller films
2018 psychological thriller films
2010s mystery thriller films
2010s psychological horror films
American horror thriller films
American mystery thriller films
American psychological horror films
American psychological thriller films
Blumhouse Productions films
Films about the Internet
Films about social media
American mystery horror films
Nudity in film
English-language Netflix original films
2010s English-language films
2010s American films